Elizabeth Habte Wold (born 1963) is an Ethiopian artist known for her mixed-media work.  She completed degrees in fine arts at the School of Fine Arts in Addis Ababa and Baltimore City Community College in Maryland, and an MFA at Howard University.  She became interested in digital media through a certificate program in interactive multimedia and web design at George Washington University.  She has worked since the mid-1990s as a multimedia designer, and lives in Addis Ababa.

Her works in a 2003 exhibition were described thus: "Wold's small collages, made from torn newspapers and magazines, ponder the fragmented lives of displaced people, both [in the U.S.] and in Ethiopia." These works were included in a group exhibition called "Ethiopian Passages: Dialogues in the Diaspora" at the Smithsonian's National Museum of African Art. Her work has also been exhibited at the National Museum of Ethiopia and Gebre Kristos Desta Center.

Wold's recent works sometimes include computer animation.

References

External links
Biographical sketch, National Museum of African Art, Washington D.C.

1963 births
Living people
Ethiopian artists
Baltimore City Community College alumni